Nephele xylina is a moth of the family Sphingidae. It is known from semi-deserts from Kenya to Ethiopia and Somalia.

References

Nephele (moth)
Moths described in 1910
Moths of Africa